Nelson Hayward (1810 – April 14, 1857) was the sixth Mayor of Cleveland, Ohio. He served only one term, in 1843. 
 
Hayward was born in Braintree, Massachusetts to William and Marjory (Thayer) Hayward. He was educated in Massachusetts and came to Cleveland with his two brothers, Joseph and John, in 1825. In 1840, Hayward became the assistant chief of the Old Volunteer Fire Department. He was elected alderman in 1841 and 1842 and served as the vice-president of the city's Temperance Society in 1842. He was elected as mayor in 1843 because of his Jacksonian Democrat political philosophy. Hayward was not re-elected because the city's political views shifted to partisan Whig and Republican. In 1844 he became a members of the Cleveland Lodge of Odd Fellows. Hayward was never married.

References
 The Encyclopedia Of Cleveland History by Cleveland Bicentennial Commission (Cleveland, Ohio), David D. Van Tassel (Editor), and John J. Grabowski (Editor) 

Mayors of Cleveland
1810 births
1857 deaths
Ohio Democrats
American temperance activists
19th-century American politicians